Trinity Academicals RFC, nicknamed "Trinity" or "Trinity Accies" is a rugby union club based in Leith, Edinburgh, Scotland, originally for the former pupils of Trinity Academy, Edinburgh.

History

Early days 
Trinity Accies has not been a club to keep detailed records. As a result, details from its earliest days are impossible to establish. The club's earliest challenge games began in 1913/14 from get-togethers of former Trinity Academy pupils (opened in 1892 as Craighall Road School) in a shelter at Starbank Park, Newhaven. The players formed a team to play challenge matches against the lower ranks of existing clubs. The "Lomond" Trinity had no link to the school. They became members of the SRU in 1903 and played in purple and white hoops. They amalgamated with Edinburgh Borderers in 1945, becoming Trinity Borderers until 1947. Early Trinity Accies games were played at Victoria Park on an irregular basis with the club playing in blue with a red badge bearing the Leith Coat of Arms. After the war the club changed to black with a gold band as their playing jersey.

Between the wars  
No rugby was played during World War I. In October 1920 (the season was October to March) the club resumed playing on a regular basis. Between the 2 World Wars Trinity was a lower grade, fairly average in terms of results, junior club. Frank Trotter, then Executive Officer of Education for Leith, gave the club access to a regular home ground, Bangholm, which was opened on 2 December 1920.

Fixtures in the 1920s and 1930s were mainly with still familiar clubs: RDVC (probably the strongest junior club over this 20 years), Leith Accies, Broughton, Boroughmuir, Bruntsfield, Edinburgh Borderers, Linlithgow, Moray House, Edinburgh Northern, Lismore, Penicuik and Lasswade. 
Less familiar names now largely forgotten include: Brunstane, Kenard, Westhall, Warriston, Gala Star, Edinburgh Rover Scouts, Kenmore, United Colleges, James Clarks FP, Grange, Broxburn HSFP, Balvaird and Dunedin. 
Away games took place at equally forgotten grounds: Forkenford, Broom Park, Ravelston, Hillend, Lady Napiers Park and Morgan Park.

From 1926 to 1931 the standard of play improved when James Hossack was appointed captain. He had played for Boroughmuir before being appointed as Head Geography teacher at Trinity Academy, which led to representative recognition for Trinity players with the Edinburgh Junior side (Edinburgh and District Union) for the first time.

As early as 5 November 1929 short reports on some of the club's games appeared in the press. On that date Trinity Accies beat Trinity at Lomond Park: "... with tries scored by Armstrong, Cowe and Furnivall."

After the war 
Few games were played during World War II. 7-a-side tournaments were played at Bangholm in 1942 and 1943. Most senior clubs expected lower teams to beat their 2nds over a number of years before they would be considered for a 1st xv fixture. It was ranked by percentage of wins against these teams. Trinity started being featured in the 1963/64 season's table until 1972–73.

Few games were played in 1945–46 with former players returning from the war. However, 14–6 and 24–3 wins over Fettes and 6–8 and 12–14 losses to Edinburgh Wanderers / Academicals ("Charie Maclean scoring 3 tries") suggest playing improvements since before the war. By the 1950s we had regular fixtures with: Melrose, Langholm, Stewarts, Edinburgh Wanderers, Melville College and Selkirk (who by tradition we played away on 1 January.) Fixtures were slowly improving and the club joined the SRU as a full member in 1950. The goal was always to create a fixture list which would lead to the Press including us in the unofficial championship. A strong run of results – including victories over Stewarts (in a year when they won the championship), Melrose, RHS, Selkirk and Langholm – led to our appearing in the league table from 1963 to 1964.

At the end of the 1964–65 season Trinity Accies were ranked 17th of the 35 teams in the championship.

The arrival of the leagues 
After many years in favour of an organised league structure, Trinity gave its full support to the SRU's proposal to introduce a formal system in 1973. Twelve teams were placed in each league playing each other once.

Representative Honours

Edinburgh 
 Dougie Mitchell  
 Ian Gibb  
 Jimmy Taylor  
 Gordon Connell  
 Rab Murdoch  
 Graeme Plenderleith
 Ian Moffat  
 Julian Vaughan

Scotland Age Group 
 Fergus Henderson  
 Robin Hamilton  
 Ross McNulty  
 Lewis Niven  
 Tom Drennan  
 Sam Pecquer

Scotland 
 Gordon Connell (5 Caps)

British Lions 
 Gordon Connell (1 Test v SA)

Championship Winning Teams

1987/88 – Division 4 Champions 
Captained by Dougie Spencer, with Jack and Dougie Hamilton coaching the side, we recovered from defeat in our first game to clinch the title in our last game. 
Lenzie 17- 20 L Leith Accies 12 - 9 W Biggar 9 - 6 W Broughton 26 - 6 W Hutchesons 19 - 9 W Wigtownshire 34 - 8 W Edin. Univ. 10 - 15 L Glenrothes 16 - 3 W Alloa 22 - 3 W Cambuslang 4 - 3 W Dumfries 20 - 4 W Peebles 18 - 3 W Clarkston 20 - 10 W

1993/94 – Division 4 Champions 
The season started badly for a team captained by Andy Wilson and coached by Ian Henderson with defeats in two out of the first three games. Because of this all the rest of the games had to be won for promotion.

Promoted Teams

1974/75 – Division 3 Promotion 
Although only second in the league this team's record is our best ever losing only one game. They gave Highland its only defeat but lost the title on points differential. The team was captained by Brian Clark and coached by Stan Grant.

1978/79 – Division 3 Promotion  
Captain was Euan Romanis and coach was Fraser Mason. The club was promoted on point's difference.

Thanks to Ian Webster the club has rare detailed playing records for all teams this promotion winning season: 
P W L D For Against 
1st XV 24 15 9 0 368 229 
2nd XV 21 14 7 0 367 212 
3rd XV 17 11 5 1 352 193 
4th XV 5 4 1 0 75 21 
Colts 12 3 9 0 124 257 17

1999/2000 - National League Division 2 Promotion 
Captained by Bob Rodriquez and with Fergus Henderson.

Rugby Teams/Sections

Ranking 
Highlights included:

 Boroughmuir 14-12 
 Stewarts 13-9 
 Edin Wands 14-12 
 Selkirk 23-5 
 Haddington 21-0 
 Edin Accies 3-3 
 Musselburgh 12-11 
 Dunfermline 14-0 
 Kirkcaldy 9-8 
 Hutchesons 20-3 
 Langholm 8-8 
 Greenock Wands 12-3 
 Kelso 11-8 
 Leith Accies 25-16 
 Hawick 8-11

These players were also responsible for Trinity Accies' victory over a Scottish senior club. In September 1968 the backs with a number of forwards making up the numbers, all played in the club's 65–0 win over Melville College—a 95–0 win using current scoring values. The game took place a week after 5 of the club's backs played in a full Edinburgh trial. Of these Gordon Connell was our first Scottish international and British Lion, Graeme Plenderleith played for Edinburgh and Glasgow, and Rab Murdoch played for Edinburgh.

7-a-side 
Little had been heard of the club in pre-war 7s.

On 16 April 1945 the club's 7s were won for the first time. Reports list the team as: A Fairfull, D Graham, C Hepburn, J Meikle, E Cessford, G Armstrong and J Scott, with victories over Leith 15–0, Stewarts 9-0 and Edinburgh Wanderers / Accies 8–0. Unfortunately, after they won their first tie, "howling wind and torrential rain" stopped the 7s for the first time in 24 years.

With more tournaments being started Trinity continued to have many successes. Walkerburn was won for the first time in 1948 with an 11–10 victory over Hawick Y M in the final. Many wins at Walkerburn were to follow. Stirling County started its own 7s in 1948. The club won the first three finals. Peebles and Moray were other venues where cups were won on a number of visits.

Youth/School 
Over the years the efforts of Alex Harper, Alan Spencer, and the long term rector Peter Galloway have kept the club well-supplied with players from school.

Touring  
Early trips to Chesterfield have been followed by more exotic tours including Burnham (England), Hanover (Germany), Juan les Pins (France), St Gallen (Switzerland), Munich (Germany) and Avignon (France). Trinity Accies have hosted teams from all over the world.

Honours

 Trinity Academicals Sevens
 Champions (2): 1945, 1948
Peebles Sevens
 Champions (3): 1961, 1966, 1967
Walkerburn Sevens
 Champions (7): 1948, 1955, 1961, 1965, 1967, 1968, 1970

References
 Massie, Allan A Portrait of Scottish Rugby (Polygon, Edinburgh)

External links 

 Trinity Accies Want You!!!!!!

Sports teams in Edinburgh
Scottish rugby union teams
Rugby union in Edinburgh
1913 establishments in Scotland
Rugby clubs established in 1913
Leith